The 1999 Royal Bank Cup is the 29th Junior "A" 1999 ice hockey National Championship for the Canadian Junior A Hockey League.

The Royal Bank Cup was competed for by the winners of the Doyle Cup, Anavet Cup, Dudley Hewitt Cup, the Fred Page Cup and a host city.

The tournament was hosted by the Yorkton Terriers and Yorkton, Saskatchewan.

The playoffs

Round robin

Results
Yorkton Terries defeat Estevan Bruins 6–1
Bramalea Blues defeat Vernon Vipers 4–2
Yorkton Terries defeat Charlottetown Abbies 2–1
Bramalea Blues defeat Estevan Bruins 4–3
Charlottetown Abbies defeat Vernon Vipers 6–5
Yorkton Terriers defeat Vernon Vipers 3–1
Estevan Bruins defeat Charlottetown Abbies 5–4
Bramalea Blues defeat Yorkton Terriers 5–1
Charlottetown Abbies defeat Bramalea Blues 5–1
Vernon Vipers defeat Estevan Bruins 3–2 for the Abbott Cup

Semi-finals and Final

Note: Charlottetown defeated Yorkton in Double Overtime.

Awards
Most Valuable Player: Dennis Bassett (Yorkton Terriers)
Top Scorer: William Hubloo (Charlottetown Abbies)
Most Sportsmanlike Player: Anthony Aquino (Bramalea Blues)
Top Goalie: Dennis Bassett (Yorkton Terriers)
Top forward: Kyle Amyotte (Bramalea Blues)
Top Defenceman: John Bradley (Vernon Vipers)

Roll of League Champions
AJHL: Calgary Canucks
BCHL: Vernon Vipers
CJHL: Hawkesbury Hawks
MJHL: OCN Blizzard
MJAHL: Charlottetown Abbies
NOJHL: Rayside-Balfour Sabrecats
OPJHL: Bramalea Blues
QJAAAHL: Valleyfield Braves
RMJHL: Kimberley Dynamiters
SJHL: Estevan Bruins

See also
Canadian Junior A Hockey League
Royal Bank Cup
Anavet Cup
Doyle Cup
Dudley Hewitt Cup
Fred Page Cup
Abbott Cup
Mowat Cup

External links
Royal Bank Cup Website

1999
Royal Bank Cup
Royal Bank Cup
Ice hockey competitions in Saskatchewan